Tugboat Annie Sails Again is a 1940 American comedy romance film directed by Lewis Seiler. The picture is a sequel to Tugboat Annie (1933). Marjorie Rambeau took over the late Marie Dressler's role, and the supporting cast features Alan Hale Sr., Jane Wyman, and Ronald Reagan.

Plot

In this sequel in the series about "Tugboat" Annie Brennan, skipper on the Narcissus, she is still feuding with her arch-rival, Captain Bullwinkle, a Washington State tugman.

Annie's volatile personality makes her come very close to losing her job as captain. The company she works for, Secoma Towing and Salvage Company, gets into real financial trouble when it fails to pay a due invoice of $25,000. Annie has to run the company while the president, Alec Severn, is at the bank trying to fix things.

Annie gets explicit orders to steer clear of the new shipyard owner, millionaire J.B. Armstrong, but she still goes into negotiations with him, trying to get him to sign a profitable contract with the company. The attempt turns into a complete failure, when Annie mistakes the millionaire for another man, treating him harshly and even manages to throw him into a heap of fish. The result is that the shipyard owner cancels the already existing contract with the company altogether.

On top of this, Annie's rival Bullwinkle tricks her into going out to sea to salvage a ship that turns out to be a whale. She manages to save the day after all when she pulls a big ship off a ground, after Bullwinkle has failed to do the same. Annie demands $25,000 as payment for the tugging, and the invoice can be paid after all.

Alec's confidence in Annie is restored and he sends her to negotiate a big job of towing a dry dock all the way to Alaska for the shipyard owner Armstrong. This negotiation too ends in failure, since he doesn't want to give the job to a woman. Shrewdly, Annie goes around this obstacle, by appointing her old friend Mike Mahoney as captain temporarily.

However, it turns out Mahoney has become a helpless drunk, and Annie has to step in to save the situation after all. Still, problems keep surfacing, and Annie finds Armstrong's spoiled daughter, Peggy, on the ship. She has hidden there to accompany her lover Eddie Kent, who is Annie's young ward.

During a storm at sea, Annie is then forced to leave the dock on a beach to save it from breaking and sinking in the waves. She also has to go ashore to hospitalize Mahoney, who has become very sick. When she is ashore, Bullwinkle steals the dock and claims finders keepers on it, according to general salvage rules. When the contract seems to have been breached, Alec fires Annie who was in charge of letting the dock go.

Before retiring entirely, Annie looks into the salvage laws, and finds that a dry dock doesn't count as a ship and the salvage claim therefore doesn't apply to it. She wins the dock back from Bullwinkle, and is reinstated as captain again.

Cast
 Marjorie Rambeau as Capt. Annie Brennan
 Alan Hale, Sr. as Capt. Horatio Bullwinkle
 Jane Wyman as Peggy Armstrong
 Ronald Reagan as Eddie Kent
 Clarence Kolb as Joseph B. 'Joe' Armstrong
 Charles Halton as Alec 'Alex' Severn
 Paul Hurst as Pete
 Victor Kilian as Sam
 Chill Wills as Shiftless
 Harry Shannon as Capt. Mike Mahoney
 John Hamilton as Capt. Broad
 Sidney Bracey as Limey (billed as Sidney Bracy)
 Jack Mower as Johnson
 Margaret Hayes as Rosie (Severn's secretary; billed as Dana Dale)
 Josephine Whittell as Miss Margaret Morgan (Armstrong's secretary)

Sequels
Another sequel appeared five years later called Captain Tugboat Annie with Jane Darwell taking over the title role.

In 1957 a Canadian-filmed television series appeared called, The Adventures of Tugboat Annie, starring Minerva Urecal as Tugboat Annie.

References

External links
 
 
 
 

1940 films
1940 romantic comedy films
American black-and-white films
American romantic comedy films
American sequel films
Films directed by Lewis Seiler
Films scored by Adolph Deutsch
Seafaring films
Tugboats in fiction
Warner Bros. films
1940s English-language films
1940s American films